Bernadette Payeur (born 1952) is a Canadian film producer.

Payeur was born in La Prairie, Quebec. She is known for producing Benoît Pilon's 2008 film The Necessities of Life and Sébastien Pilote's films The Salesman (2011) and The Dismantling (2013).

For The Necessities of Life, she was nominated for the Genie Award for Best Motion Picture. In 2015, she produced Pilon's film Iqaluit for Quebec's Association coopérative de productions audio-visuelles (ACPAV).

References

External links

1952 births
Film producers from Quebec
Living people
People from La Prairie, Quebec
Canadian women film producers
French Quebecers